"Re:Re:" (pronounced ) is a song by Japanese rock band Asian Kung-Fu Generation from their second full-length studio album, Sol-fa. In 2016, they re-recorded Sol-fa and new version of Re:Re: was released as the lead single on March 16, 2016. The 2016 version of Re:Re: was used as the opening for the anime Erased. The song was ranked 2nd on fans request for band's 10th anniversary live setlist on September 14, 2013.

Music video
The music video for "Re:Re:" was directed by Kazuyoshi Oku. The video features band's old music videos mixed with their live performance. In the end of video, all footage combined and create a word "Re:Re:".

Track listing

Charts

Awards and nominations
Newtype Anime Awards

|-
|2016
|"Re:Re:"
|Best Theme Song
|
|}

Release history

References

Asian Kung-Fu Generation songs
2016 singles
Songs written by Masafumi Gotoh
Songs written by Takahiro Yamada (musician)
2016 songs
Ki/oon Music singles
Anime songs